The fifth season of Queer as Folk, an American and Canadian television series, premiered on Showtime on May 22, 2005, and on Showcase on May 23, 2005. Consisting of thirteen episodes, season five served as the final season for Queer as Folk.

The series finale aired on August 7, 2005, in the United States and August 15, 2005, in Canada.

Cast

Main cast
 Gale Harold as Brian Kinney
 Randy Harrison as Justin Taylor
 Hal Sparks as Michael Novotny
 Peter Paige as Emmett Honeycutt
 Scott Lowell as Ted Schmidt
 Thea Gill as Lindsay Peterson
 Michelle Clunie as Melanie Marcus
 Robert Gant as Ben Bruckner
 Sharon Gless as Debbie Novotny

Supporting cast
 Harris Allan as James "Hunter" Montgomery
 Sherry Miller as Jennifer Taylor
 Matt Battaglia as Drew Boyd
 Makyla Smith as Daphne Chanders
 Peter MacNeill as Carl Horvath
 Meredith Henderson as Callie Leeson
Mike Shara as Brett Keller
 Dean Armstrong as Blake Wyzecki
 Stephanie Moore as Cynthia
 Rosie O'Donnell as Loretta Pye

Episodes

 In the United States, the season premiere consisted of episodes #1 and #2.

References

2005 American television seasons
2005 Canadian television seasons
Queer as Folk